Anthony Deane may refer to:

 Sir Anthony Deane (mayor) (1633–1721), politician and shipwright
 Anthony C. Deane (1870–1946), Canon of Worcester Cathedral
 Anthony Deane-Drummond (1917–2012), British Army officer
 Anthony Deane (skeleton racer) (born 1984), Australian skeleton racer

See also
 Anthony Dean (disambiguation)